The University of Georgia is a private university founded in Tbilisi, in the country of Georgia, in 2004.

History 
The University of Georgia was founded in 2004 under the name of "Georgian University of Social Sciences". The University Founders were doctor of Historical Sciences, Professor Giuli Alasania, and doctor of Historical Sciences, Professor Manana Sanadze.

From 2005 through 2007 the university developed and grew significantly. Masters programs were added to the Bachelors Programs during these years. By 2007 the university had already received its first PhD program students. In 2010, for the first time in the post-Soviet era, the United States Agency OPIC (Overseas Private Investment Corporation) invested multimillion dollars in the development of the university's infrastructure.

Study in Georgia

The Schools (Faculties) of the University of Georgia
The School of Arts and Humanities
The School of Law
The School of Social Sciences
The School of Informatics, Engineering and Mathematics
The School of Health Sciences and Public Health
The School of Business, Economics and Management

The School of Arts and Humanities
The School of Arts and Humanities was founded in 2005. The School consists of three departments: 
The Department of Philology and European Languages
The Department of History and Asian Studies
The Department of Archeology, Anthropology and Art

The School offers certificate courses in various languages and preparation courses for national entry examinations and national Master's entry examinations. The School organizes national and international scientific conferences and actively participates in scientific research work.

Programs

BA
Archeology;
Oriental Studies;
English Philology;
History (Georgia, World);
Georgian Philology;
Art; 
English Philology (in English); 
Architecture and Design; 
English Program in Architecture and Design.

MA
English Philology;
Cultural and Social Anthropology;
History of Georgia; 
Education Administration (in English).

PhD
History;
Cultural and Social Anthropology;
English Philology.

The School of Law 
Established in 2005, the School of Law of the University of Georgia offers accredited BA, MA and PhD programs. The primary teaching process is distinguished by its education based on general and specific instruction, case law teaching, as well as simulated trials and appeals. The program is replenished with English subjects. The teaching methods are primarily focused on developing professional skills for the practice of law, with advanced study in advanced theory. A wide range of subjects complies with the students’ interests in the fields of public, private, criminal and international law.

Starting in September 2016, the School of Law launched the International Business Law (IBL) program, which is the first of its kind in Georgia.

Programs

BA
Law

MA
Law
International Business Law (English)

PhD
Law

Some resources
The School of Law is home to the TOLES Legal English Centre Georgia. The Test of Legal English Skills (TOLES) is an international exam, based in the UK, which assesses a legal practitioner's knowledge of practical English language skills. UG is the only TOLES test center in the Caucasus region. Legal English is an important part of the School of Law's curriculum; all bachelor students must take four semesters of English and one semester of Legal English.

Besides the practical one, the law school also focuses on the scientific-research component. The Georgian, German and International Criminal Law Institute conducts research at the school, offers regular workshops, public lectures, scientific conferences and competitions in moot court processes. The aim of the Institute is to promote the development of criminal dogmatism and practice. Due to this fact, its activities are not limited to pure theoretical studies, but they are given adequate attention to practical problems in material or formal criminal law.

A simulation Courtroom allows students to receive hands on, practical experience of a courtroom. The School of Law offers summer schools for various courses such as criminal law, private law, public law, etc.

The School of Social Sciences
The School of Social Sciences was founded in 2004.

Programs 
BA
Political Science 
Journalism 
International Relations 
Public Relations 
Psychology

MA
International Relations 
Public Relations and Advertising 
Applied Psychology

PhD
Political Science 
Mass Communication

The School of Informational Technologies
The educational programs are developed based on the analysis and experience of similar programs at leading foreign universities. IT programs comprise the courses delivered by international certifying courses of Microsoft, Oracle and Cisco Academies. 

Programs 
BA
Electrical and Computer Engineering; (Geo/Eng); 
English Bachelor Program in Engineering;
Informational Technologies;
Mathematics; 
English Bachelor Program in Information Technology.

MA
Informational technologies; 
Applied Sciences;
English Master's Program in Information Technology.

PhD 
Computer Technologies;
Exact, Natural and Computer Sciences.

UG Limes Robotics Academy - is the only academy in Georgia that enables bachelor's and master's students of electrical and electronic engineering, mathematics and computer science to conduct their own research and to teach to school children. UG-LIMES is one of the main organizations in Georgia, which defines STEM, programming and robotics learning policy.

The School of Health Sciences and Public Health
The School of Health Sciences and Public Health was founded in 2005. The educational programs are established with the contribution of Georgian healthcare experts. The study program was developed by Georgian and foreign specialists and universities of Scranton, Central Florida and Tromsø, Norway.

The School of Health Sciences and Public Health gives an opportunity to deliver teaching and research process using innovative methods and a wide range of options applying modern medicine into practice. The School is a member of European Public Health Association (EUPHA) and represents Georgia. It is a member of American Association of University Programs in Health Administration (AUPHA).

Programs 
BA
Health Care Administration 
Nursing
Pharmacy

MA
Health Care Administration
Pharmacy Management Program
Pharmacy Program

PhD
Public Health

Single-Cycle
Dental Program in English
English Program of Medical Education

The School of Economics, Business, and Management
The School of Economics, Business and Management was founded in 2004.

Programs 
BA
Business Administration ( Marketing and Banking, Accounting and Audit, Management) 
Tourism
Economics
Public Administration

MA
Business Administration
Public Administration

PhD
Business Administration

International recognition
The university cooperates with the European and US leading universities and offers exchange programs at various European universities for one semester or a year. Thus the university has exchange programs within the individual cooperation, Erasmus Plus.

Career services
The office of career services regularly offers trainings to students to improve skills necessary for career development. In order to promote student employment, job fairs on campus are held several times a year, where leading companies and the representatives of public sector take part.

Programs for international students

BA
English Philology
Electrical and Computer Engineering
Business Administration (Marketing and Banking, Accounting and Audit, Management)
Nursing 
Pharmacy

MA
Education Administration
International Business Law 
Business Administration

Single-Cycle
Dental Program 
Medical Education

Admission
Citizens of Georgia who apply should successfully pass Unified National Entrance Examinations. Foreign high-school graduates who received complete general education abroad or its equivalent and the last two years of complete general education studying abroad, or students who lived abroad for the last two or more years and who are currently studying abroad in higher educational institutions recognized by the legislation of the host countries, will be able to enter the program without passing Uniform National Entrance Examinations, according to Order No.224/N of the Minister of Education and Science of Georgia (December 29, 2011).

References

Universities in Georgia (country)
Education in Tbilisi
Educational institutions established in 2004
2004 establishments in Georgia (country)